Super Trouper may refer to:

 Super Trouper (album), by the pop group ABBA
 "Super Trouper" (song), from that same album
 "Super Trouper", a song by Deep Purple on the album Who Do We Think We Are
 Super Trouper (spotlight), a brand of spotlight

See also
 Super Trooper, a fictional character in the G.I. Joe universe
 Super Troopers, a 2001 comedy film